F-number or F number may refer to:

f-number, the ratio of the lens's focal length to the diameter of the entrance pupil
F number (chemistry), is a number that can be calculated for polycyclic aromatic hydrocarbons from their structure
Fujita scale, a rating of a tornado's intensity by its impact on structures and vegetation
F number in the cross-breeding of hybrid animals such as the Savannah cat, a number that indicates the number of generations of distance from wild stock

See also
F-ratio (disambiguation)
F scale (disambiguation)
function keys (on a computer keyboard, F1, F2, F3, etc.)